The 1967 Lamar Tech Cardinals football team represented the Lamar State College of Technology—now known as Lamar University as a member of the Southland Conference during the 1967 NCAA College Division football season. Led by fifth-year head coach Vernon Glass, the Cardinals compiled an overall record of 7–3 with a mark of 3–1 in conference play, placing second in the Southland. Lamar Tech played home games at Cardinal Stadium in Beaumont, Texas.

Schedule

References

Lamar Tech
Lamar Cardinals football seasons
Lamar Tech Cardinals football